Thomas Goldsworthy Dutton (1820–1891) was a 19th-century English marine lithographer, draftsman, watercolourist, painter, and etcher.

Early life
Born in 1820 in London, Middlesex, England, and named after his father, an Ironmonger. Dutton married Martha Foster on 27 Apr 1843, at St John, Hackney, Middlesex. He lived thereafter mainly in Lambeth.

Career

He has the reputation of being one of the finest lithographers of 19th-century nautical scenes and ship portraits. He was also a noted watercolorist, and oil painter. His marine paintings were generally created for his lithographs. These original works are quite rare in the marketplace.

He practised from premises in Fleet Street, London, and his work was often exhibited at the Suffolk Street Gallery between 1858–1879. Much of his work was for the lithographic printing company Day and Haghe.

The National Maritime Museum, Greenwich, holds almost a complete collection of his published lithographs.

He is often incorrectly named as Thomas Goldsworth Dutton on the web. He usually signed his work as "T. G. Dutton". Some water colours as "Thomas G Dutton" and there are oils signed "TGD", in one case at least on a buoy hidden within the painting. His work is known for its accuracy and attention to detail

Death
Dutton died, a widower, on 12 March 1891 at his home, in Lavender Gardens, Clapham Common in Wandsworth, London, England. He was buried on 17 March at the South Metropolitan cemetery, Norwood, South London.

Collections
His works are in the following collections:
 The Royal Collection
 The National Maritime Museum, Greenwich
 Smithsonian National Museum of American History

Gallery

Notes

References

External links

 More on T G Dutton

1820 births
1891 deaths
British marine artists
English lithographers